Ron Merk is an American independent filmmaker based in San Francisco, California. He is a producer and director best known for producing Marco Polo: Return to Xanadu.

External links

Year of birth missing (living people)
Living people
Film producers from California
Place of birth missing (living people)
Film directors from San Francisco